Madeline Singas (born 1966) is an American attorney and judge who serves as an associate judge of the New York Court of Appeals since 2021.

Born in Queens, in 1966, Singas is the first Greek American to serve on the New York Court of Appeals.

Early life and education 

Singas was born in 1966, into a Greek family, and grew up in Astoria, Queens. She graduated from The Bronx High School of Science in Bronx, New York. She earned degrees at Barnard College at Columbia University in New York City and Fordham University School of Law.

Legal career 
Before joining the Nassau County District Attorney's Office, Singas was an assistant district attorney in the New York City borough of Queens. She began there in 1991, and worked in the Domestic Violence Bureau. After joining the Nassau County District Attorney's Office, she was appointed chief of the newly-created Special Victims Bureau in 2006 by Nassau County district attorney Kathleen Rice. Singas became Chief Assistant District Attorney in Nassau County in 2011.

District attorney of Nassau County 

Singas served as acting Nassau DA starting in January 2015, assuming the role following Rice's election to Congress. Upon taking office, Singas became the first Greek-American and the second woman to become the top law enforcement official of Nassau County. She was elected in November 2015 and took office for a four-year term in January 2016.

During an interview with Bill Ritter in late 2017, referring to crimes committed by MS-13 gang members, Singas stated: "The crimes that we're talking about are brutal. Their weapon of choice is a machete. We end up seeing people with injuries that I've never seen before. You know, limbs hacked off. And that's what the bodies look like that we're recovering. So they're brutal. They're ruthless, and we're gonna be relentless in our attacks against them."
On March 27, 2018, Singas announced the establishment of the Nassau County School & Community Safety Task Force to enhance the security of schools, colleges, places of worship, and public buildings. The Task Force is chaired by Deputy Executive Assistant District Attorney for Community Relations, Joyce Smith.

Appointment as special prosecutor 

In May 2018, in the wake of allegations of sexual assault by then-attorney general Eric Schneiderman, New York Governor Andrew Cuomo appointed Singas as special prosecutor to investigate such allegations, as well as any facts "suggesting that the attorney general staff and office resources may have been used to facilitate alleged abusive liaisons."

Public policy advocacy 

On April 3, 2018, Singas appeared at a rally and spoke before an audience of about 200 people at Temple Beth Israel, a synagogue in Port Washington, New York, advocating in favor of what she described as common sense gun legislation. She was quoted as having said: "Why is legislation so difficult to get passed? I don’t know the answer to that question."

Singas was the defendant in a federal constitutional case, Maloney v. Singas (formerly Maloney v. Rice), in which the plaintiff is seeking a declaration that he has a constitutional right to possess nunchaku, a martial-arts weapon, in his home for peaceful martial-arts practice and home defense. In that case, through counsel, Singas has argued that nunchaku are "dangerous and unusual" weapons that may be banned totally even for such use.

New York court of appeals service 
On May 25, 2021, governor Andrew Cuomo announced that he would nominate Singas to serve as an associate judge of the New York Court of Appeals, replacing Leslie Stein. She was confirmed by the New York State Senate on June 8, 2021, and took office that same day. Her formal investiture ceremony took place on April 5, 2022.

See also 
 List of Fordham University School of Law alumni
 List of Bronx High School of Science alumni

References 

1966 births
21st-century American judges
21st-century American politicians
21st-century American women lawyers
21st-century American lawyers
21st-century American women politicians
Barnard College alumni
Fordham University alumni
Judges of the New York Court of Appeals
Lawyers from Queens, New York
Living people
Nassau County District Attorneys
People from Astoria, Queens
People from Manhasset, New York
Politicians from Nassau County, New York
Politicians from New York City
The Bronx High School of Science alumni
21st-century American women judges